The Davona Dale Stakes is a Grade II American Thoroughbred horse race for three year old fillies, over a distance of one mile on the dirt held annually in late February or early March at Gulfstream Park, Hallandale Beach, Florida.  The event currently carries a purse of $200,000.

History
The Davona Dale is named after Calumet Farm's champion homebred filly foaled in 1976. She not only won the Grade I Kentucky Oaks as a 3-year-old, but then swept the New York Triple Tiara series: the Acorn Stakes, the Mother Goose Stakes, and the Coaching Club American Oaks. She is the only filly to win the Kentucky Oaks, the Black-Eyed Susan Stakes and the Triple Tiara. Davona Dale was inducted into the National Museum of Racing and Hall of Fame in 1985. She also ranks #90 in Blood-Horse magazine List of the Top 100 Racehorses of the 20th Century.

The event was inaugurated on 5 March 1988 and was run in split divisions over a distance of 7 furlongs for four year old fillies and mares.

In 1990 the conditions of the event was limited to three year old fillies.

In 1991 the distance of the event was increased to one mile and seventy yards.

The event was upgraded to Grade III in 1993 and upgraded once more to Grade II in 1998.

The Davona Dale has been run at a variety of distances with the current distance of one mile set in 2015.

The event is part of the Road to the Kentucky Oaks.

Records
Speed Record:
 1 mile – 1:36.25  R Heat Lightning    (2011)
 7 furlongs - 1:22.60 Waggley  (1989)
 1 mile & 70 yards - 1:39.31  	Glitter Woman (1997)
 miles - 	1:42.30 Live Lively (2013)
 miles - 	1:50.20 Sis City (2005)

Margins:
 16 lengths -  Sis City (2005)

Most wins by an owner:
 2 – Scott Savin (1989, 1990)

Most wins by a jockey:
 6 – John Velazquez (1999, 2001, 2003, 2005, 2006, 2011)

Most wins by a trainer:
 5 – Claude R. McGaughey III (1988, 1997, 2003, 2018, 2022)

Winners

See also
Davona Dale Stakes top three finishers and starters
Road to the Kentucky Oaks
 List of American and Canadian Graded races

External links
 2020–21 Gulfstream Park Media Guide

References

1988 establishments in Florida
Horse races in Florida
Gulfstream Park
Flat horse races for three-year-old fillies
Graded stakes races in the United States
Recurring sporting events established in 1988
Grade 2 stakes races in the United States